The 1991 Western Kentucky Hilltoppers football team represented Western Kentucky University as an independent during the 1991 NCAA Division I-AA football season Led by third-year head coach Jack Harbaugh, the Hilltoppers compiled a record of 3–8. The team's captain was Milton Biggins.

Schedule

References

Western Kentucky
Western Kentucky Hilltoppers football seasons
Western Kentucky Hilltoppers football